Cyperus haematocephalus is a species of sedge that is native to parts of South Africa.

See also 
 List of Cyperus species

References 

haematocephalus
Plants described in 1897
Flora of South Africa
Taxa named by Johann Otto Boeckeler